Nola is a genus of moths described by William Elford Leach in 1815. They are the namesake of the subfamily Nolinae and the family Nolidae. This genus occurs worldwide wherever suitable habitat is present.

Description
Palpi porrect (extending forward), moderately long with thick scales. Antennae fasciculated in male. Mid tibia with single spur pair, whereas hind tibia with two pairs. Forewings with vein 5 from angle of cell, vein 6 from upper angle, veins 7 and 8 stalked and veins 8 and 10 absent. Hindwing with vein 3 from before angle of cell, vein 5 absent, veins 6 and 7 stalked and vein 8 from middle of cell.

Species

 Nola achromata Hampson, 1900
 Nola acutula Püngeler, 1902
 Nola adelpha (D. S. Fletcher, 1958)
 Nola aegyptiaca Snellen, 1875
 Nola aenictis (Meyrick, 1888)
 Nola aerugula (Hübner, 1793)
 Nola aeschyntela Dyar, 1914
 Nola albalis (Walker, [1866])
 Nola albescens Bethune-Baker, 1908
 Nola albirufa (Schaus, 1905)
 Nola amorpha (Turner, 1944)
 Nola analis (Wileman & West, 1928)
 Nola ancipitalis (Herrich-Schäffer, [1851])
 Nola angola Bethune-Baker, 1911
 Nola angulata (Moore, 1888)
 Nola angustipennis Inoue, 1892
 Nola anisogona (Lower, 1893)
 Nola anpingicola (Strand, 1917)
 Nola apera Druce, 1897
 Nola apicalis (Hampson, 1903)
 Nola appelia (Hampson, 1900)
 Nola arana Schaus, 1896
 Nola argentea (Lucas, 1890)
 Nola argyrolepis Hampson, 1907
 Nola argyropasta (Hampson, 1914)
 Nola artata Schaus, 1912
 Nola astigma Hampson, 1894
 Nola atmophanes (Turner, 1944)
 Nola atripuncta (Hampson, 1909)
 Nola aulacota (Meyrick, 1886)
 Nola bananae Holland, 1920
 Nola baracoa Schaus, 1921
 Nola barbertonensis (Son, 1933)
 Nola basirufa (de Joannis, 1928)
 Nola bathycyrta (Turner, 1944)
 Nola belotypa Hampson, 1914
 Nola benguetensis Wileman, 1916
 Nola bicincta Hampson, 1905
 Nola bifascialis (Walker, [1865])
 Nola biguttalis (Walker, [1866])
 Nola bilineola (Rothschild, 1916)
 Nola bimaculata (van Eecke, 1920)
 Nola bionica Hampson, 1907
 Nola bistriga (Möschler, 1890)
 Nola bitransversata Holloway, 1979
 Nola biumbrata Schaus, 1912
 Nola brachystria Hampson, 1905
 Nola breyeri Köhler, 1924
 Nola brunneifera Dyar, 1914
 Nola caelata Draudt, 1918
 Nola calcicola Holloway, 2003
 Nola callis (van Eecke, 1920)
 Nola canioralis (Walker, 1863)
 Nola carilla (Schaus, 1911)
 Nola celaenephes (Turner, 1944)
 Nola celidota (Wileman & West, 1928)
 Nola ceramota (Turner, 1944)
 Nola cereella (Bosc, [1800]) - sorghum webworm
 Nola cerraunias (Turner, 1899)
 Nola ceylonica Hampson, 1893
 Nola chauna Dyar, 1914
 Nola chionaecensis (Hampson, 1914)
 Nola chionea Hampson, 1911
 Nola chlamitulalis (Hübner, [1813])
 Nola cicatricalis (Treitschke, 1835)
 Nola cilicoides (Grote, 1873)
 Nola cingalesa Moore, [1882]
 Nola classeyi Holloway, 2003
 Nola clethrae Dyar, 1899
 Nola coelobathra (Turner, 1944)
 Nola cogia (Schaus, 1921)
 Nola concinna (Hampson, 1918)
 Nola concinnula (Walker, 1863)
 Nola confusalis (Herrich-Schäffer, [1851])
 Nola conspicillaris D. S. Fletcher, 1962
 Nola contorta Dyar, 1914
 Nola coremata Holloway, 2003
 Nola coticula (van Eecke, 1920)
 Nola cretacea (Hampson, 1901)
 Nola cretaceoides Poole, 1989
 Nola cristatula (Hübner, 1793)
 Nola cristicostata (Rothschild, 1916)
 Nola crucigera (Turner, 1944)
 Nola cubensis Schaus, 1921
 Nola cucullatella (Linnaeus, 1758)
 Nola curvilinea (Wileman & South, 1919)
 Nola cycota (Meyrick, 1886)
 Nola cymatias (Turner, 1944)
 Nola delograpta (Turner, 1944)
 Nola dentilinea (Hampson, 1909)
 Nola desmotes (Turner, 1899)
 Nola diagona Hampson, 1911
 Nola diastropha (Turner, 1944)
 Nola dimera (Dognin, 1912)
 Nola diplogramma (Hampson, 1914)
 Nola diplozona Hampson, 1914
 Nola disticta (Hampson, 1900)
 Nola divisa Schaus, 1896
 Nola dochmographa D. S. Fletcher, 1958
 Nola doggensis Strand, 1920
 Nola drepanucha D. S. Fletcher, 1958
 Nola dresnayi (Warnecke, 1946)
 Nola duercki (Zerny, 1935)
 Nola duplicilinea (Hampson, 1900)
 Nola ebatoi (Inoue, 1970)
 Nola elaphra (Turner, 1944)
 Nola elaphropasta (Turner, 1944)
 Nola elsa Schaus, 1921
 Nola emi (Inoue, 1956)
 Nola endoscota Hampson, 1914
 Nola endotherma (Hampson, 1918)
 Nola enphaea (Hampson, 1901)
 Nola epicentra (Meyrick, 1886)
 Nola erythrostigmata Hampson, 1894
 Nola estonica Õunap, 2021
 Nola eucolpa (Turner, 1944)
 Nola eucompsa (Turner, 1944)
 Nola eugrapha Hampson, 1914
 Nola eupithecialis (Debauche, 1942)
 Nola euraphes (Turner, 1944)
 Nola eurrhyncha (Turner, 1944)
 Nola eurylopha Turner, 1944
 Nola euryzonata (Hampson, 1900)
 Nola exumbrata Inoue, 1976
 Nola faircloughi Holloway, 2003
 Nola fasciata (Walker, 1866)
 Nola fenula van Eecke, 1926
 Nola fijiensis Robinson, 1975
 Nola fisheri Holloway, 2003
 Nola flavescens Dyar, 1914
 Nola flaviciliata (Hampson, 1901)
 Nola flavicosta (Kiriakoff, 1958)
 Nola flavomarginata (Rothschild, 1916)
 Nola flexuosa Poujade, 1886
 Nola folgona Schaus, 1921
 Nola foliola (van Eecke, 1926)
 Nola formosalesa (Wileman & West, 1928)
 Nola fortulalis (van Eecke, 1926)
 Nola fovifera (Hampson, 1903)
 Nola foviferoides Poole, 1989
 Nola fraterna (Moore, 1888)
 Nola furvitincta (Hampson, 1914)
 Nola fuscantea (van Eecke, 1920)
 Nola fuscata Wileman & West, 1928
 Nola fuscibasalis (Hampson, 1896)
 Nola fuscibasis (Bethune-Baker, 1904)
 Nola fuscimarginalis Wileman, 1914
 Nola geminata (Mabille, 1900)
 Nola goniophora Turner, 1944
 Nola gorgoruensis Strand, 1920
 Nola grisalis Hampson, 1893
 Nola habrophyes Dyar, 1914
 Nola harouni (Wiltshire, 1951)
 Nola helpsi Holloway, 2003
 Nola herbuloti Toulgoët, 1982
 Nola hermana Schaus, 1896
 Nola hesycha (Meyrick, 1888)
 Nola hiranoi Inoue
 Nola holoscota Hampson, 1920
 Nola hyalospila (Hampson, 1914)
 Nola hypenoides Talbot, 1929
 Nola imitata (Son, 1933)
 Nola inconspicua Alphéraky, 1882
 Nola ineffectalis (Walker)
 Nola infralba Inoue, 1976
 Nola infranigra Inoue, 1976
 Nola innocua Butler, 1880
 Nola insularum (Collenette, 1928)
 Nola intermedia Druce, 1885
 Nola internella (Walker, [1865])
 Nola internelloides (van Eecke, 1926)
 Nola interrupta Pagenstecher, 1884
 Nola interruptoides Poole, 1989
 Nola interspera (Lucas, 1890)
 Nola involuta Dyar, 1898 (=Nola exposita Dyar, 1898, Nola aphyla (Hampson, 1900))
 Nola irenica (Meyrick, 1886)
 Nola iridescens (Son, 1933)
 Nola irrorata (Rothschild, 1915)
 Nola japoniba (Strand, 1920)
 Nola jarvisi Holloway, 2003
 Nola joanna Schaus, 1921
 Nola jourdani (Legrand, 1965)
 Nola juvenis (Holland, 1893)
 Nola kanshireiensis (Wileman & South, 1916)
 Nola karelica Tengström, 1869
 Nola kennedyi D. S. Fletcher, 1958
 Nola kreuteli (Vartian, 1963)
 Nola lagunculariae Dyar, 1899
 Nola laticincta Hampson, 1896
 Nola lechriopa Hampson, 1914
 Nola lechriotropa (Turner, 1944)
 Nola leucalea Hampson, 1907
 Nola leucographa D. S. Fletcher, 1958
 Nola leucolopha (Turner, 1944)
 Nola leucoma (Meyrick, 1886)
 Nola leucoscopula (Hampson, 1907)
 Nola lichenosa Robinson, 1975
 Nola limona Schaus, 1921
 Nola lindemannae D. S. Fletcher, 1962
 Nola liparisalis (Walker, 1865)
 Nola loxoscia Hampson, 1900
 Nola lucidalis (Walker, [1865])
 Nola lutulenta (Wileman & West, 1928)
 Nola luzonalesa (Wileman & West, 1928)
 Nola maculifera (Turner, 1944)
 Nola maia Schaus, 1912
 Nola marginata Hampson, 1895
 Nola maria Schaus, 1921
 Nola marshallae Holloway, 2003
 Nola melaleuca (Hampson, 1901)
 Nola melalopha (Hampson, 1900)
 Nola melanchysis Hampson, 1900
 Nola melanogramma Hampson, 1900
 Nola melanoscelis (Hampson, 1914)
 Nola melicerta Druce, 1885
 Nola meridionalis Wallengren, 1875
 Nola mesographa Schaus, 1905
 Nola mesogyna Dognin, 1912
 Nola mesomelana (Hampson, 1900)
 Nola mesonephele (Hampson, 1914)
 Nola mesoscota Hampson, 1900
 Nola mesosticta (Hampson, 1900)
 Nola mesotherma (Hampson, 1909)
 Nola mesothermoides Poole, 1989
 Nola microlopha (Hampson, 1900)
 Nola microphila (Turner, 1899)
 Nola minna Butler, 1881
 Nola minna Butler, 1881
 Nola monofascia Son, 1933
 Nola monozona (Lower, 1897)
 Nola nami (Inoue, 1956)
 Nola nebulosa (Rothschild, 1916)
 Nola negrita Hampson, 1894
 Nola negrosensis Wileman & West, 1929
 Nola nephelepasa Dyar, 1914
 Nola nigrisparsa Hampson, 1896
 Nola nigrolineata (van Eecke, 1926)
 Nola nigroradiata Debauche, 1942
 Nola nimbimargo Dyar, 1914
 Nola niphostena (Lower, 1896)
 Nola niveibasis E. D. Jones, 1914
 Nola obliqua Bethune-Baker, 1908
 Nola obliquilinealis (Toulgoët, 1972)
 Nola ochrographa Hampson, 1911
 Nola ochrolopha (Hampson, 1911)
 Nola ochrosticha Turner, 1944
 Nola okanoi (Inoue, 1958)
 Nola oleaginalis (Toulgoët, 1972)
 Nola omphalota (Hampson, 1903)
 Nola opalina (Walker, 1862)
 Nola ovilla Grote, 1875
 Nola owgarra (Bethune-Baker, 1908)
 Nola pallescens Wileman & West, 1929
 Nola parallacta (Meyrick, 1886)
 Nola parana Schaus, 1921
 Nola paromoea (Meyrick, 1886)
 Nola paroxynta (Meyrick, 1886)
 Nola parwana (Ebert, 1973)
 Nola pascua (Swinhoe, 1885)
 Nola patina Druce, 1885
 Nola patricia Son, 1933
 Nola pauai Wileman & West, 1928
 Nola pedata D. S. Fletcher, 1962
 Nola peguensis (Hampson, 1894)
 Nola perfusca Hampson, 1911
 Nola perluta Draudt, 1918
 Nola phaea Hampson, 1900
 Nola phaeocraspis (Hampson, 1909)
 Nola phaeogramma (Turner, 1944)
 Nola phaeotermina (Hampson, 1918)
 Nola phloeophila Hampson, 1914
 Nola picturata Mabille, 1899
 Nola plagioschema Turner, 1939
 Nola platygona (Lower, 1897)
 Nola pleurochorda (Turner, 1944)
 Nola pleurosema (Turner, 1944)
 Nola polia (Hampson, 1900)
 Nola poliophasma (D. S. Fletcher, 1958)
 Nola poliophasma (Turner, 1933)
 Nola poliotis Hampson, 1907
 Nola porrigens (Walker, 1858)
 Nola pothina Turner, 1944
 Nola praefica Saalmüller, 1884
 Nola progonia (Hampson, 1914)
 Nola promelaena Hampson, 1914
 Nola prothyma Dyar, 1914
 Nola pulverea Hampson, 1900
 Nola pumila Snellen, 1875
 Nola punctilinea (Wileman & South, 1919)
 Nola punctivena Wileman, 1916
 Nola pura (D. S. Fletcher, 1957)
 Nola pustulata (Walker, 1865)
 Nola pycnographa (Turner, 1944)
 Nola pycnopasta (Turner, 1944)
 Nola pygmaea (Hampson)
 Nola pygmaeodes (Turner, 1944)
 Nola quadrimaculata Heylaerts, 1892
 Nola quilimanensis Strand, 1920
 Nola quintessa Dyar, 1914
 Nola ralphia (Schaus, 1921)
 Nola ralumensis (Strand, 1920)
 Nola recedens Schaus, 1921
 Nola robusta (Wileman & West, 1928)
 Nola rodea Schaus, 1896
 Nola rotundalis Toulgoët, 1982
 Nola rubescens Schaus, 1921
 Nola rufa (Hampson, 1900)
 Nola rufimixta (Hampson, 1900)
 Nola rufizonalis Hampson, 1918
 Nola sakishimana (Inoue, 2001)
 Nola samoana (Hampson, 1914)
 Nola santamaria Schaus, 1921
 Nola sarniensis (Son, 1933)
 Nola scabralis (Walker, [1866])
 Nola scruposa (Draudt, 1918)
 Nola semiconfusa Inoue, 1976
 Nola semidolosa (Walker, [1863])
 Nola semirufa (Dognin, 1914)
 Nola semograpta (Meyrick, 1886)
 Nola sertalis Toulgoët, 1982
 Nola sijthoffi van Eecke, 1920
 Nola simplex Wileman & West, 1929
 Nola sinuata Forbes, 1930
 Nola socotrensis (Hampson, 1901)
 Nola solvita Schaus, 1896
 Nola sperata Schaus, 1912
 Nola spermophaga D. S. Fletcher, 1962
 Nola sphaerospila (Turner, 1944)
 Nola spinivesica Holloway, 2003
 Nola squalida Staudinger, 1870
 Nola streptographia (Hampson, 1900)
 Nola subchlamydula Staudinger, 1871
 Nola suffusa (Hampson, 1900)
 Nola swierstrai Son, 1933
 Nola sylpha (Dyar, 1914)
 Nola synethes (D. S. Fletcher, 1958)
 Nola taeniata Snellen, 1875
 Nola taiwana Wileman & South, 1916
 Nola tarrawayi Holloway, 2003
 Nola tarzanae (Legrand, 1965)
 Nola tenebrosa Hampson, 1896
 Nola tenella (Hulstaert, 1924)
 Nola tetralopha (Turner, 1944)
 Nola tetrodon de Joannis, 1928
 Nola tholera (Turner, 1926)
 Nola thymula Millière, 1868
 Nola thyrophora (Hampson, 1914)
 Nola tincta Wileman & South, 1919
 Nola tineoides (Walker, [1858])
 Nola tornalis (Hampson 1914)
 Nola tornotis (Meyrick, 1888)
 Nola townsendi Tams, 1935
 Nola transecta Hampson, 1901
 Nola transitoria Son, 1933
 Nola transversata Robinson, 1975
 Nola transwallacea Holloway, 2003
 Nola triangulalis (Toulgoët, 1961)
 Nola trilinea Marumo, 1923
 Nola triplaga Dognin, 1914
 Nola tripuncta (Wileman, 1910)
 Nola triquetrana (Fitch, 1856)
 Nola trocha Dognin, 1897
 Nola tumulifera Hampson, 1893
 Nola turbana Schaus, 1921
 Nola tutulella Zerny, 1927
 Nola undulata (D. S. Fletcher, 1962)
 Nola varia Saalmüller, 1884
 Nola vepallida Turner, 1944
 Nola vernalis Lower, 1900
 Nola vernalis Lower, 1900
 Nola vesiculalis van Eecke, 1926
 Nola vicina (Roepke, 1948)
 Nola vidoti (Legrand, 1965)
 Nola wilsonae Holloway, 2003
 Nola yegua Schaus, 1921
 Nola yoshinensis (Wileman & West, 1929)
 Nola zaplethes Hampson, 1914
 Nola zeteci Dyar, 1914

References

External links

 
Taxa named by William Elford Leach